Elmira Pet Products Ltd. is a manufacturer of pet foods in Elmira, Ontario, Canada.  They produce a range of private-label and branded cat and dog food. What is now Elmira Pet Products was founded in 1923 as Martin Feed Mills, which provided grain for local farmers. In 1979 it expanded into the manufacture of pet foods and rebranded as Martin Pet Foods. Following a succession of sales to Heinz and Del Monte, in 2005 employees Bryan Cook and Ken Morley, purchased the plant and created Elmira Pet Products Ltd. As of 2017, the 80,000 square foot facility employed more than 200 people and as of 2014 they were Canada's largest manufacturer of private label, dry pet food. In 2009, Elmira Pet Products purchased Nutram Pet Products.  Nutram is a premium brand dog and cat food that was originally a division of Maple Lodge Farms and was located in Beamsville, Ontario.

References

External links
 

Manufacturing companies of Canada
Pet food brands
Canadian companies established in 1923
Manufacturing companies based in Ontario